Umayyads may refer to:

Umayyad dynasty, a Muslim ruling family of the Caliphate (661–750) and in Spain (756–1031)
Umayyad Caliphate (661–750)
Emirate of Córdoba (756–929)
Caliphate of Córdoba (929–1031)